Mick Walker may refer to:
  Mick Walker (vocalist,   born 1961)  , American Vocalist for vag-a-bond 2022/one legged rocker 2016/antix 1988
Mick Walker (footballer, born 1945), English football player
Mick Walker (footballer, born 1940), English football player and manager
Mick Walker (motorcycling) (1940–2012), English motorcycle racer, motorcycle dealer, and author

See also
Michael Walker (disambiguation)
Mike Walker (disambiguation)